Excitatory amino-acid transporter 4 (EAAT4) is a protein that in humans is encoded by the SLC1A6 gene.

EAAT4 is expressed predominantly in the cerebellum, has high affinity for the excitatory amino acids L-aspartate and L-glutamate.  When stimulated by these amino acids, EAAT4 conducts chloride ions.

References

Further reading

Solute carrier family
Glutamate (neurotransmitter)